Java Embedding Plugin (JEP) enables Java on Mac OS X with non-Safari browsers. This plugin is shipped with Firefox 1.5 on, and all recent versions of SeaMonkey and Camino.

The latest released version, 0.9.7.5, requires Mac OS X 10.4.11 or higher.

History 
Originally for the PowerPC based Macs, a port to Intel x86 was needed.

Version 0.9.6.1 had a security vulnerability that allowed remote attackers to crash the browser.

See also 

Flash plugin

References

External links
 javaplugin.sourceforge.net homepage
 sourceforge.net project site

Free web browsers
MacOS web browsers
Firefox
Java platform